In mathematics, the Euler sequence is a particular exact sequence of sheaves on n-dimensional projective space over a ring. It shows that the sheaf of relative differentials is stably isomorphic to an -fold sum of the dual of the Serre twisting sheaf.

The Euler sequence generalizes to that of a projective bundle as well as a Grassmann bundle (see the latter article for this generalization.)

Statement
Let  be the n-dimensional projective space over a commutative ring A. Let  be the sheaf of 1-differentials on this space, and so on. The Euler sequence is the following exact sequence of sheaves on :

Geometric interpretation
We assume that A is a field k.

The exact sequence above is dual to the sequence
,

This sequence is most easily understood by interpreting sections of the central term as 1-homogeneous vector fields on V.  One such section, the Euler vector field, associates to each point  of the variety  the tangent vector .  This vector field is radial in the sense that it vanishes uniformly on 0-homogeneous functions, that is, the functions that are invariant by homothetic rescaling, or "independent of the radial coordinate".

A function (defined on some open set) on  gives rise by pull-back to a 0-homogeneous function on V (again partially defined). We obtain 1-homogeneous vector fields by multiplying the Euler vector field by such functions. This is the definition of the first map, and its injectivity is immediate.

The second map is related to the notion of derivation, equivalent to that of vector field. Recall that a vector field on an open set U of the projective space  can be defined as a derivation of the functions defined on this open set. Pulled-back in V, this is equivalent to a derivation on the preimage of U that preserves 0-homogeneous functions. Any vector field on  can be thus obtained, and the defect of injectivity of this mapping consists precisely of the radial vector fields.

Therefore the kernel of the second morphism equals the image of the first one.

The canonical line bundle of projective spaces
By taking the highest exterior power, one sees that the canonical sheaf of a projective space is given by  In particular, projective spaces are Fano varieties, because the canonical bundle is anti-ample and this line bundle has no non-zero global sections, so the geometric genus is 0. This can be found by looking at the Euler sequence and plugging it into the determinant formula  for any short exact sequence of the form .

Chern classes
The Euler sequence can be used to compute the Chern classes of projective space. Recall that given a short exact sequence of coherent sheaves,

For example, on  we find  
where  represents the hyperplane class in the Chow ring . Using the exact sequence 
 
we can again use the total Chern class formula to find 
 
Since we need to invert the polynomial in the denominator, this is equivalent to finding a power series  such that .

Notes

References 
 
 

Algebraic geometry
Projective geometry